FabricLive.41 is a 2008 mix album by Simian Mobile Disco. The album was released as part of the FabricLive Mix Series.

Track list
  Tomita - The Firebird - Infernal Dance of King Kastchei (Clean Version) - SonyBMG 0:13
  Sisters Of Transistors - The Don - This is Music 2:52
  Simian Mobile Disco - Simple - Wichita 4:31
  Hercules and Love Affair - Blind (Serge Santiago Version) - EMI 6:26
  Smith n Hack - Space Warrior - Errorsmith and Soundhack 2:41
  Discodeine - Joystick - Dirty 3:48
  Shit Robot - Chasm - DFA 5:14
  Perc & Fractal - Up Tool - Kompakt 1:39
  Metro Area - Miura - Environ 3:32
  The Worthy - Crack EL - Leftroom 2:31
  Moondog - Suite Equestria - Roof 2:46
  Fine Cut Bodies - Huncut Hacuka - Chi Recordings 3:31
  Bentobox - Aemono - Imprimé 2:44
  Deadmau5 vs Jelo - The Reward is Cheese - Rising Trax 3:32
  Simian Mobile Disco - Sleep Deprivation (Simon Baker Remix) - Wichita 4:58
  Popof - The Chomper (LSD Version) - Turbo Recordings 3:28
  Raymond Scott - Cindy Electronium - Basta 2:13
  Paul Woolford Presents: Bobby Peru - Erotic Discourse - 2020 Vision 2:28
  Moebius-Plank-Neumeier - Pitch Control - Sky Records 1:13
  Plastikman - Spastik - Mute 1:59
  Green Velvet - Flash - Relief Records 5:58
  The Walker Brothers - Nite Flights (Album Version)- Sony BMG'' 3:58

External links
Fabric: FabricLive.41

Simian Mobile Disco albums
2008 compilation albums